Breitmeyer is a German surname. Notable people with the surname include:

 Arno Breitmeyer (1903–1944), German sports official
 Philip Breitmeyer (1864–1941), American florist

See also
 Maggy Breittmayer (1888–1961), Swiss violinist

German-language surnames